Lysva is a river in Perm Krai, Russia. By the river lies the town of Lysva.

References

Rivers of Perm Krai